Bodily mutilation in film describes the apparent mutilation for theatrical purposes of a character in a film. Bodily mutilation is most usually portrayed in the context of horror, but is also used in other genres, such as medical dramas or war films. It is used primarily either to shock or fascinate the audience of a film, or to add a sense of realism to a film. Improved special effects in recent decades have seen an increase in the prevalence of bodily mutilation in film.

Brief history

Early years

In the early years of motion picture, horror was often used in order to attract and intrigue audiences. To frighten and  fascinate the audience was the goal. Lon Chaney was well known for his portrayals in various horror films, but the subject in focus is his use of makeup to create his ghastly visages. He was known as “the man of 1,000 faces.” (Rickett 2000) Chaney was arguably one of the forerunners of makeup use in horror films. Some others include actors Boris Karloff and Lon Chaney Jr. But it was the man behind their makeup, Jack Pierce, who made them what they were (Rickett 2000). While these movie makers didn't make films rife with violence and mutilation, their influence on later film makers was great. Early horror movies focused on suspense and monsters but as realism has progressed, movie makers have focused more on realistically portraying the horrible fate of whoever is unfortunate enough to fall victim to the fell devices.

Advent of horror
Although there was a boom of monster and alien flicks in the 50s and movie makers using make up more for realistic depictions of violence and gore in the 60s, the advent of realism in horror as we now know it arguably began with the 1973 film The Exorcist. This was the first of its kind as far as special effects used realistically to portray gruesome scenes. This movie, created by director William Friedkin with make up master Dick Smith directing the effects set the stage for countless other such films to be made. After the release of The Exorcist and its subsequent popularity scary movies began to shift and the violent horror flick became a major genre. With effects greats Kevin Yagher, Dick Smith, and Tom Savini behind such classic horror films as Friday the 13th (1980), A Nightmare on Elm Street (1984), Halloween (1978), and Dawn of the Dead (1978) this genre gained immense popularity (Rickett 2000). This craze peaked during the 80's went down a little in the 90's but with the movie Scream (1996) horror movies were back in. As special effects continue to get better, so the horror films continue to grow even more violent, gruesome, and realistic in their portrayals of human mutilation as can be seen in the recent Saw films (2004,2005, 2006, 2007) as well as others such as Hostel (2005) and Hostel: Part II (2007). However horror films are not the only movies that have worked to realistically portray bodily mutilation.

War Films
War movies have often romanticized battle and violence for glory; but after the Vietnam War, many movies worked to portray war in its true form, all the violence, brutality, and even the psychological distress included. This is shown in several films including The Deer Hunter (1978) and Casualties of War (1989). A great example is the classic film Saving Private Ryan (1998). In the beginning of this movie there is a 15-minute scene showing the landing of American troops at Omaha beach. In this scene there are untold amounts of blood and gore as German machine guns literally rip the U.S. soldiers apart achieved through bullet hit squibs. Other war movies such as Flags of Our Fathers (2006), Enemy at the Gates (2001), and Letters from Iwo Jima (2006) work to show the effects of battle on the human body.

Modern Media
Nowadays, you can find body mutilation in many different kinds of movies. Some of the more common examples are in movies or shows that depict hospital or law enforcement. As hospital and police movies and TV shows gain popularity and attempt to make the situation more real, they have utilized techniques to make operations and crimes as realistic as possible. This includes breaks, burns, cuts, surgery, and violent attacks. This portrayal is often graphic, but accurate. Regardless of intent, movies have progressed greatly from the early years of Chaney and Pierce in the realistic portrayals of bodily mutilation.

Notable names

Lon Chaney

Although not a pioneer when it comes to mutilation, Lon Chaney was the inspiration for many film makers who were. Born on April 1, 1883 in Colorado  Springs, Colorado to deaf mute parents, Lon Chaney did not have the easiest childhood (Anderson 1997).  However, this did not prevent him from becoming a magician with makeup. Throughout many various films, Chaney perfected his craft. He did his makeup for all the films he was in. Chaney's makeup kit set the standard for later makeup departments in Hollywood. While his most widely known films are The Hunchback of Notre Dame (1923) and The Phantom of the Opera (1925), perhaps some of his most important contributions to modern horror films and their emphasis on the mutilation came from his work in lesser known films. For example, Chaney used collodian to make realistic scars and deformities for his characters Singapore Joe in The Road to Mandalay (1926), Ricardo in Victory (1919), and Tiger Haynes in Where East is East (1929). Chaney died on August 26, 1930 in Los Angeles, California due to complications with throat cancer (Anderson 1997).

Jack Pierce
Jack Pierce did the makeup man behind popular monster creatures Frankenstein (1931), The Mummy (1932), and The Wolf Man (1941) (Rickett 2000).

Dick Smith
Born on June 26, 1922, Dick Smith is one of the most influential men on the art of makeup. As John Caglione Jr. put it, “No one will ever take over for Dick Smith. In forty-five years of doing makeup, I don't think anyone’s touched him. He is the heavyweight champion of makeup (Timpone 1996).”  Master of makeup, Smith helmed many movies’ special effects, but he excelled in prosthetics and age makeup. Notable examples are that of Marlon Brando as the Don in The Godfather (1972) and F. Murray Abraham as Salieri in Amadeus (1984). He also did age makeup for Max von Sydow as Father Merrin in The Exorcist making this 44-year-old look 74 (Multimedia Publications 1986). In this movie he made maybe his greatest contribution to modern mutilation technique with the 360° turn of Linda Blair's head. This scene complete with vomit spewing and severe facial distortions set the bar for future film makers. Although possibly his greatest contribution to horror, it was not his last. He later worked on other films including the 1977 film The Sentinel in which he coordinated the effects for a gruesome nose and eye slashing (Timpone 1996) among other things.

Tom Savini

Known as the King of Splatter (Rickett 2000), Tom Savini has quite a reputation for his work in horror movies much of which has included severe bodily mutilation in many circumstances. According to Anthony Timpone in his book Men, Makeup, and Monsters, Savini started his career young. Earlier makeup artists provided him with inspiration. “Lon Chaney became a hero,” he said. Drafted into the military during the Vietnam War, he became a combat photographer. He would practice his craft on the men he was with, but also got a taste of true gore. “I’ve seen the real stuff.” While in Vietnam, Savini saw many gruesome sights including bodies in rigor mortis and even a dismembered arm. This may have provided him with material he would later use in his movies. And he did use gore and violence in his movies. Perhaps this is stated best by Timpone.

“Prior to Savini’s work on Dawn of the Dead, realistic screen slaughter had rarely gone to the unrated extremes it would soon reach in the early 80s with Savini’s guidance. Via his macabre tricks, heads were severed, scalped, axed, exploded, and pierced. Machetes hacked off limbs, fangs tore through chunks of human flesh, and blood bags sprayed gallons of grue. Zombies, ghouls, demons, hideously disfigured maniacs, and other assorted Savini-created monsters racked up endless body counts.” 

This master of splatter was behind many horror films’ effects including Martin (1978), Maniac, Friday the 13th (1980), Friday the 13th: The Final Chapter (1984), Day of the Dead (1985), The Texas Chainsaw Massacre 2 (1986), and Two Evil Eyes (1990). “My job is to create the stuff as realistically as possible.”

Rick Baker
Rick Baker is known mainly for his work making ape films (Timpone 1996).  However, he is well known for his work on An American Werewolf in London (1981), specifically the on screen transformation of the main character into a werewolf (Multimedia Publications 2986). While this may not be considered mutilation, the transformation is a radical change from human to monster and therefore evokes many of the same emotions.

Kevin Yagher
Mastermind behind the psychotic doll Chucky, Kevin Yagher is known for his work with animatronics (Timpone 1996). He also did effects for the Nightmare on Elm Street movies 2-4.

Bob Keen
Bob Keen did effects on the movies Hellraiser (1987) and Nightbreed (1990)

Greg Nicotero

Movies and television shows
The Exorcist (1973) With the Linda Blair head turn and accompanying effects, this film inspired many film makers.
Martin (1978) The scene where Martin, the title character, slits the wrist of an unconscious girl shows a trick used to fool the audience into believing in the realism of the action.
Dawn of the Dead (1978) This film was very original. In fact, according to effects man Tom Savini, this film was largely improvised during its making. “We’d be sitting around thinking of ways to kill a zombie.” These ways include stabbing one in the ear with a screwdriver, and cutting one's head to pieces with a helicopter's rotors.
Halloween (1978) and sequels
Friday the 13th (1980) and sequels
The Howling (1981) With its full on screen transformation and a scene where Eddie Quist gets acid flung into his face before a transformation, this movie shows the human body realistically distorted, and mutilated in the case of the acid, in a way new to film at the time.
An American Werewolf in London (1981) Released in the same year as The Howling, this movie also showed the change from man to wolf. It also shows some pretty gruesome undead. While released later than The Howling this movie used some innovative techniques developed by Rick Baker and who went on to win an Oscar for his makeup on the film. (Hollywood tricks of the trade page 133)
The Evil Dead (1981) This movie may not have been particularly successful or popular, but the makers were creative when faced with production problems, including having to come up with their own formula for fake blood. This consisted of corn syrup, food coloring, and instant coffee to thicken it (Multimedia Publications 1986).
A Nightmare on Elm Street (1984) and sequels
Scream (1996) and sequels
ER (1994-2009)
Saving Private Ryan (1998)
CSI: Crime Scene Investigation (2000- ) and spin offs (Miami, New York, etc.)
Black Hawk Down (2001)
Saw (2004) and sequels
Hostel (2005) and sequels
Hatchet (2006) and sequels

Techniques
The tricks of the trade are what make these effects convincing. The following are a few basic techniques or tricks that have been used to create the image of mutilation.

Blood

Fake blood can be made in many different ways. One of the cheapest and easiest can be made with varying recipes including corn syrup and food dye. For example, in the movie The Evil Dead the makers used a mixture consisting of corn syrup, food colouring, and instant coffee. Fake blood is used in nearly every, if not every single, movie that has shown bodily mutilation, be it human or otherwise. Some effective uses of fake blood include use of a bullet hit squib, or small explosive device, with a metal plate between the actor and the squib and a packet of fake blood to simulate the blood splatter that would accompany a gunshot for example. Another used for fake blood is seen in the movie Martin when the main character cuts the wrist of a girl. This trick is accomplished by hiding a syringe or bulb behind the fake weapon and squeezing out the fake blood as the weapon is drawn across the victim.

Scar effects
Fake scars can be made in many different ways. Actor Lon Chaney used collodion. In more recent years, with the advent of latex and plastics there are many ways to make fake flesh and scarring.

Burns
Burns are used in many films and correct technique can create a more effective visual. For first degree burns, merely put down a red foundation with a little purple on top. Use skin colored powder to prevent the “burn” from shining. For a second degree burn create fake blistering surrounded by the standard first degree reddening. To create the blistering, you can use petroleum jelly in saran wrap, or using pure gum latex and lifting the center after drying.  Third degree burns are severe and should reflect that in the effect. The skin is charred and broken. This effect can be achieved with the  latex, plastic wax material, or other plastic appliance. Be sure to color the burned flesh convincingly, then gradient from third degree burn, to second degree to first.

Latex
Latex is a synthetic rubber often used in special effects. Foamed latex is sometimes considered the "ultimate in prosthetic appliance."  It can be used in an inflatable bladder effect to make it seem like the actor's skin is moving or rippling like Rick Baker's werewolf change effect An American Werewolf in London. This is accomplished by covering an inflatable balloon of some type underneath a covering made of latex, urethane, or plastic molding. Latex can also be used to make scar effects or other more blatant mutilation. For example, with latex prosthetics, movie makers can make an actor appear to have more or less limbs than he should. They can also make the actor appear to be horribly wounded with flesh hanging and large gashes. To accomplish these tricks, the actor must first have a mold made of the part of him that will be replicated using latex. Take, as an example, one of the zombies in Dawn of the Dead. To make this actor seem to be rotting, they need to make a cast. The technicians prep the area of the body, say the face, to be cast. They must cover the hair and coat the eyebrows, eyelashes, and any other hair that can't be covered with petroleum jelly. Then they must apply the alginate or other comparable substance, completely covering the molding area, keeping the mouth, nose, or both open for breathing. When that is finished, they layer the area with plaster bandages to create the cast. When all of it has dried and settled, they remove the cast from the actor and put it together again to create the mold. After this, they pour plaster of Paris into the mold to create a cast that is exactly like the actors face. From the cast they can get another mold which they then can use to sculpt any prosthetic attachments they need. This can include fake limbs, fake skin, or growths. It is important to use the a good adhesive to apply the prosthetic. In his book Vincent Kehoe recommends one that is "easy to apply, set[s] rapidly, be dilutable for use, and be removable with a solvent that is not harmful to the skin.

References

Print sources
 Rickett, Richard “Special Effets: The History and Technique” New York; Billboard Books, 2000
 Timpone, Anthony “Men, Makeup, and Monsters: Hollywood’s Masters of Illusion and FX” New York; St. Martin's Press, 1996
 Anderson, Robert G. “Faces, Forms, Films” New York; A.S. Barnes and Company, 1997
 Multimedia Publications “Hollywood Tricks of the Trade” New York; Gallery Books, 1986
 Kehoe, Vincent J-R “Technique of the Professional Makeup Artist” Newton; Butterworth-Heineman, 1995

External links
 Internet Movie Database

Films by topic